The Sky Is Bleeding is the fourth extended play by Irish artist Biig Piig, released on 21 May 2021 through Sony.

Background and release
The first and only single prior to the release of the EP, "Lavender", was released on 16 April 2021 alongside a music video. The EP was released on 21 May 2021.

Critical reception
The EP was mostly well received by critics.

Tracklist

References

2021 EPs